is a former Japanese football player.

Club statistics

References

External links

jsgoal

1981 births
Living people
University of Tsukuba alumni
Association football people from Shizuoka Prefecture
Japanese footballers
J2 League players
Sagan Tosu players
Mito HollyHock players
Association football forwards